Gary David Freear (born 4 May 1982) is an English cricketer. Freear is a right-handed batsman. He was born in King's Lynn, Norfolk.

Freear made his debut for Cambridgeshire County Cricket Club in the 2000 Minor Counties Championship against Suffolk. In 2001, he made his List A cricket debut against Somerset in the 2001 Cheltenham & Gloucester Trophy. He played three further List A matches for Cambridgeshire, the last coming against Northamptonshire in the 2004 Cheltenham & Gloucester Trophy. He played for Cambridgeshire until the end of the 2014 season.

In his spare time Gary works as a carpenter for his family business. More recently he has founded GDF Bats and makes and sells cricket bats and other equipment to the buyers specifications. 

Gary for many years has been a groundsman at Wisbech Cricket Club, where he resided on the grounds in the ‘chod shack’.  This was until he found his now wife Heidi Allen.

References

External links

1982 births
Living people
Cambridgeshire cricketers
Cricketers from King's Lynn
English cricketers